Fasanvej station is a rapid transit station on the Copenhagen Metro in Frederiksberg, Denmark. It was known as Solbjerg Station until 25 September 2006. The station opened 12 October 2003, and serves the M1 and M2 lines. It is located in fare zone 2.

History
The former Solbjerg Station functioned between 13 December 1986 and 1 January 2000 as a stop on the Copenhagen S-train track between Vanløse station and Frederiksberg station. Following the closure of Frederiksberg station on 20 June 1998, Solbjerg became the line terminus until this line stopped operations as part of the S-train network and the line converted to a part of the Metro network. The former S-train station was located above ground on the western side of Søndre Fasanvej. The Metro station is located below ground on the eastern side of the street.

References

External links
Fasanvej station on www.m.dk 
Fasanvej station on www.m.dk 

M1 (Copenhagen Metro) stations
M2 (Copenhagen Metro) stations
Railway stations opened in 2003
Railway stations in Denmark opened in the 21st century